André Tourigny (born May 31, 1974) is a Canadian professional ice hockey coach who is the head coach for the Arizona Coyotes of the National Hockey League (NHL). He previously served as an assistant coach for the Ottawa Senators and Colorado Avalanche.

Coaching career
From 2002 to 2013 Tourigny served as the head coach and general manager for the Rouyn-Noranda Huskies of the Quebec Major Junior Hockey League (QMJHL). Tourigny served as an assistant coach for the Canada men's national junior ice hockey team at the IIHF World U20 Championship in 2010 and 2011, helping the team to win a silver medal in both 2010 and 2011.

On June 24, 2013, Tourigny opted to pursue an NHL coaching career in accepting an assistant coaching role for fellow former QMHL coach Patrick Roy of the Colorado Avalanche. After two seasons with the Avalanche as their primary defensive coach, Tourigny, seeking a head coaching position, resigned from his position on May 17, 2015.

On July 3, 2015, Tourigny was named as an assistant coach of the Ottawa Senators. On April 12, 2016, Tourigny was fired by the Senators.

On May 2, 2016, Tourigny signed a five-year contract as the head coach of the Halifax Mooseheads of the QMJHL. He was the ninth head coach in franchise history.

On June 13, 2017, Tourigny left the Halifax Mooseheads after one season and joined the Ottawa 67's of the Ontario Hockey League (OHL) to become the head coach and vice president of hockey operations. He became the ninth head coach in the 67's history.

On July 5, 2018, Tourigny was named head coach of the Canada men's national under-18 ice hockey team for the 2018 Hlinka Gretzky Cup, where Canada took home gold.

Following a 50–12–6 record and franchise record-breaking 106 points, Tourigny was named OHL Coach of the Year after coaching the 67's to a top place finish in the regular season and an Eastern Conference Championship, where the 67's set the OHL record for 14 straight wins to start a playoff since the conference playoff format was introduced. Tourigny followed that up with his second OHL Coach of the Year with a 50–11–1 record and 101 points prior to the OHL season being cancelled. The 67's set a franchise record for consecutive wins of 15 and yet another first-place finish in the OHL regular season standings. For his efforts, Tourigny also took home the CHL Coach of the Year award.

During the 2019–20 season, Tourigny served as an assistant coach for the Canadian junior national team again at the 2020 World Junior Ice Hockey Championships, where he took home a gold medal. On January 27, 2020, Tourigny was retained as head coach for the 2021 World Junior Ice Hockey Championships. On March 24, 2021, Tourigny was signed to a one-year contract by Hockey Canada to serve as either head coach or assistant coach in various international competitions.

On July 1, 2021, Tourigny was named as head coach of the Arizona Coyotes on a three-year contract.

Head coaching record

NHL

QMJHL

OHL

Awards and honours

References

External links
 Andre Tourigny's staff profile at Eliteprospects.com

1974 births
Living people
Colorado Avalanche coaches
Halifax Mooseheads coaches
National Hockey League assistant coaches
Ottawa Senators coaches
People from Centre-du-Québec
Rouyn-Noranda Huskies coaches